A Christian college is an educational institution or part of an educational institute dedicated to the integration of Christian faith and learning in traditional academic fields.

Christian colleges in the United States

Many Christian colleges are affiliated with or are run by a Christian denomination, while others are non-denominational. Christian colleges include a range of schools from regionally or nationally accredited universities offering liberal arts and professional programs to non-accredited Bible colleges that prepare students mainly or exclusively for vocational ministry.

See also
 Council for Christian Colleges and Universities
 Lists of universities and colleges

References

Christian universities and colleges